West-Siberian Metal Plant (Russian: Западно-Сибирский металлургический комбинат) is a metal plant in the city of Novokuznetsk in Kemerovo Oblast in southwestern Siberia, founded on 27 July 1964. The West-Siberian Metallurgical Plant is owned and operated by Evraz. The company's name is abbreviated to ZSMK (Russian:ЗСМК). It is one of the largest smelters in the Siberian region and the fifth-largest metallurgical plant in Russia. ZSMK's products are sold in over 30 different countries around the world.

In 2016, over 5.4 million tons of pig iron and over 6.9 million tons of steel were produced by the Metallurgical Plant.

References

Evraz
Novokuznetsk
Manufacturing companies established in 1964
Steel companies of the Russian Soviet Federative Socialist Republic
Companies based in Kemerovo Oblast
1964 establishments in Russia